Kaczmarek (archaic feminine: Kaczmarkowa, plural Kaczmarkowie) is the 18th most common surname in Poland (62,399 people in 2009) and the second most popular in Greater Poland (24,185) and Lubusz Land (3,121).  The name is a diminutive from the Old Polish version of the word karczmarz,  meaning "innkeeper".

Notable people
 Adam Kaczmarek (born 1961), Polish sport shooter
 Bogusław Kaczmarek (born 1950), Polish football manager
 Gabriele Katzmarek (born 1960), German politician
 Jan A. P. Kaczmarek (born 1953), Polish composer
  (b. 6 June 1945, d. 14 November 2007), Polish singer and songwriter
 Jane Kaczmarek (born 1955), American actress
 Jerzy Kaczmarek (born 1948), Polish fencer
 Konrad Kaczmarek, Polish footballer
 Łukasz Kaczmarek (born 1994), Polish volleyball player
 Marcin Kaczmarek (swimmer) (born 1977), Polish swimmer
 Marcin Kaczmarek (footballer, born 1974), Polish football player
 Marcin Kaczmarek (footballer, born 1979), Polish football player
 Marta Kaczmarek, Polish-Australian actress
 Mateusz Kaczmarek, Polish footballer
 Natalia Kaczmarek (born 1998), Polish athlete
 Oliver Kaczmarek (born 1970), German politician
 Paweł Kaczmarek (born 1985), Polish footballer
 Paweł Kaczmarek (born 1995), Polish sprint kayaker
 Wojciech Szczęsny Kaczmarek, president of Poznań
 Tomasz Kaczmarek, Polish football manager
 Zbigniew Kaczmarek (born 1962), Polish football player
 Zbigniew Kaczmarek (born 1946), Polish weightlifter

Fictional characters
 Pete Kaczmarek (portrayed by Jerry O'Connell) in The Defenders
 Clay Kaczmarek, also known as "Subject 16", in the Assassin's Creed franchise

See also
 
Karczmarek
Karczmarz
Kaczmarz
Kreczmar

References

Polish-language surnames
Occupational surnames